WFOR (1400 AM, "The Score 92.7") is a radio station licensed to serve Hattiesburg, Mississippi, United States.  The station is owned by Eagle Broadcasting, LLC.

Programming
WFOR broadcasts a sports format as an affiliate of the Fox Sports Radio network. Syndicated sports talk programming on WFOR includes The Dan Patrick Show.  Local programming includes "The Pine Belt Sports Drive" and "To The Top Talk" with Jamie Arrington.

History

WFOR's initial construction permit, with the sequentially assigned call letters WRBJ, was issued in March 1928 to the Woodruff Furniture Co. at 119 West Pine Street in Hattiesburg, Mississippi. In late 1931 the call letters were changed to WPFB, and in 1936 they became WFOR.

In October 1945 B. B McLemore joined WFOR as its chief engineer. The station's first high-powered 250 watt transmitter, hand built by McLemore, was at the time the most powerful in southern Mississippi. The original studio was in an old two story building on Hemphill Street. In the early 1950, a new tower and an office location on West 7th Street were constructed.  While constructing the current tower the top section came ajar, and a 30 foot (10 meter) section fell to the ground, leaving a worker dangling by rope on the tower in shock. Weeks passed but finally the new section was installed and proper guide tension wires attached.  When the original transmitter was retired it was returned to McLemore, who maintained it as a keepsake for over 50 years.

In September 1998, Radio Hattiesburg, Inc., reached an agreement to sell WFOR to Cumulus Media as part of a multi-station deal valued at a combined $4.5 million.  The deal was approved by the FCC on December 18, 1998, and the transaction was consummated on April 2, 1999.

In October 2000, Cumulus Media, LLC, announced an agreement to sell WFOR to Clear Channel Communications (the forerunner to iHeartMedia) as part of a large station swap and sale, including seven Cumulus stations in the Laurel-Hattiesburg radio market.  The deal was approved by the FCC on December 19, 2000, and the transaction was consummated on January 18, 2001.

A fire was noticed at the station's transmitter site at around 7:45 p.m. local time on December 15, 2015. WFOR's owner iHeartMedia's senior vice president of programming Jackson Walker noted that there was no timetable for returning the station to the air and that the fire marshal said the building was a total loss.

On July 20, 2016, iHeartMedia announced that WFOR would be sold to Eagle Broadcasting, LLC for $120,000, and the transaction was consummated on October 5, 2016. The next day "TheScore1400 WFOR-AM" was relaunched at 11:45 local time by the new owners.

References

External links

FCC History Cards for WFOR (covering WRBJ / WPFB / WFOR from 1928-1979)

FOR
Sports radio stations in the United States
Forrest County, Mississippi
Radio stations established in 1928
1928 establishments in Mississippi
Fox Sports Radio stations